The Wannadies is an album by Swedish band The Wannadies. It was released in 1997 as their first album for the US market, seven years after their debut in Sweden. It is based on the band's fourth album Bagsy Me, also released in 1997. As well as slightly changing the order, it omits two tracks ("Bumble Bee Boy" and "Combat Honey") replacing them with two further singles from the band's third album Be A Girl ("Might Be Stars" and "How Does It Feel?" - "You and Me Song" was also originally from Be A Girl but was also included on Bagsy Me).

Track listing

References

External links
Official Wannadies website

The Wannadies albums
1997 albums